Mika Mäkeläinen (born 30 May 1965) is a Finnish foreign news journalist and non-fiction writer, who has served as both the United States and Asia correspondent for the Finnish public broadcasting company Yle. Mäkeläinen was stationed in Washington, D.C., between 2006 and 2009 and in Beijing between 2015 and 2017.

Mäkeläinen is a four-time recipient of the best report of the year award (in different categories) in the CNN World Report competition. He holds a master's degree in theology from the University of Helsinki, and was accepted into the John S. Knight Journalism Fellowship at Stanford University in 2003.

Mäkeläinen has received international attention for his coverage of North Korea.
In 2016, he was the only Nordic journalist invited to cover the 7th Congress of the Workers' Party of Korea. His most notable book, Kimlandia: silminnäkijänä Pohjois-Korean kulisseissa, is based on his experiences in the country. In 2019, a panel of judges selected Kimlandia as the best nonfiction book at the TIETOKIRJA.FI event in Helsinki.

Most recently, Mäkeläinen has participated in the creation of a virtual reality experience depicting the nuclear testing at Enewetak Atoll. He was a speaker at the 2019 Online News Association Conference.

Bibliography
. Church Research Institute, 1993. series C, 0781-8572; no. 49. 
. Tietoteos, 1997. .
. Kirjapaja, 2010. .
. Co-written with Jim Solatie. Talentum, 2013. .
. Atena, 2019. .

References

External links
 
 Mika Mäkeläinen on the Yle website

1965 births
Living people
Finnish reporters and correspondents
Finnish non-fiction writers
Finnish expatriates in China
Finnish expatriates in the United States